Emily Bruni (born 1975 in Exeter, Devon) is an English actress. She trained at the Guildhall School of Music and Drama in London. In 2000, she played Tanya in the drama Metropolis by Peter Morgan. She starred alongside Rik Mayall in the sitcom Believe Nothing as Dr. Hannah Awkward (a professor of pedantics). The series was written by Maurice Gran and Laurence Marks. In 2002 she appeared alongside Bill Nighy in the return of Auf Wiedersehen, Pet. In 2004 she played Alice in Passer By by Tony Marchant, directed by David Morrissey.

Bruni portrayed the Empress Catherine the Great in the 2005 television documentary Catherine the Great. She also played the role of Sarah Woodruff in the BBC version of The French Lieutenant's Woman, narrated by John Hurt and repeated on BBC Radio 7 in February 2009. From 2009 to 2012 she played Gail, the girlfriend of Jeremy's love interest, in Series 6, 7 and 8 of Channel 4's Peep Show.

In theatre, Bruni spent three years at the Royal Shakespeare Company where roles included Esmeralda in Camino Real, directed by Steven Pimlott. Bruni starred as Jean Rhys in The Shared Experience production After Mrs Rochester (Sydney Theatre). She played Lady India in Ring Round The Moon (Playhouse Theatre), choreographed by Wayne McGregor. In 2013 she played Claire in Yes, Prime Minister (Trafalgar Studios) written and directed by Jonathan Lynn. 

In 2015, Bruni performed in Donkey Heart and the one woman show Before You Were Born, both by Moses Raine, directed by Nina Raine at the Trafalgar Studios. In 2016, she starred in the Steven Berkoff double bill Lunch and The Bow of Ulysses (Trafalgar Studios), directed by Nigel Harman. The following year, Bruni appeared as Goneril in a production of King Lear in the Globe Theatre.

Bruni played the iconic role of Debbie / Deborah in Laurence Boswell's production of the Donald Margulies play The Model Apartment at the Bath Ustinov theatre. She was then reunited with writer director Will Bridges with whom she collaborated on the short film Shallow (co'- starring Dan Stevens) appearing as Kim in the ABC show Soul Mates. 

In 2021 Bruni played Actress in Psychodrama : a one woman show about an actress under investigation for the murder of an auteur theatre director, whilst rehearsing a production of Hitchcock's Psycho. The play was written and directed by Matt Wilkinson. Sound by Gareth Fry. Lighting by Elliot Griggs. Both Gareth Fry and Bruni were nominated for Offie awards for their part in the production.  

Bruni is a regular contributor to Radio Four drama

References

External links

1975 births
Living people
English people of Italian descent
Actors from Exeter
Alumni of the Guildhall School of Music and Drama
English television actresses
People educated at Hele's School, Exeter
Actresses from Devon